Kanithi Viswanatham is an Indian politician belonging to the Indian National Congress. He was elected to the Lok Sabha the lower house of the Indian Parliament from Srikakulam, Andhra Pradesh in 1989 and 1991.

References

External links
Official biographical sketch in Parliament of India website

1932 births
People from Srikakulam
India MPs 1989–1991
India MPs 1991–1996
Indian National Congress politicians from Andhra Pradesh
Lok Sabha members from Andhra Pradesh
Living people